Cơm hến (baby basket clams rice) is a Vietnamese rice dish originating in Huế. It consists of cooked baby river mussels (basket clams), rice, peanuts, pork rinds, shrimp paste, chili paste, starfruits and bạc hà stems, and is normally served with the broth of cooked mussels at room temperature.

References

Vietnamese cuisine
Vietnamese rice dishes
Vietnamese seafood dishes
Seafood and rice dishes